Viktoria Radostinova Dimova (born 8 January 2002) is a Bulgarian footballer who plays as a goalkeeper for Women's National Championship club FC NSA Sofia and the Bulgaria women's national team.

International career
Dimova capped for Bulgaria at senior level in a 0–6 friendly loss to Croatia on 14 June 2019.

References

2002 births
Living people
Women's association football goalkeepers
Bulgarian women's footballers
Bulgaria women's international footballers
FC NSA Sofia players